The Knickerbocker Apartments were located at 501-535 Knickerbocker Place in the Valentine Neighborhood of Kansas City, Missouri.  The Late 19th and 20th Century Revival style building was designed by Leon Grant Middaugh and J.A. Rose, and was built in 1909.  It is significant for its architecture, and was added to the National Register of Historic Places in 2003. It was demolished in 2020.

The Historic Kansas City Foundation listed the apartments on their 2014 Most Endangered list of buildings in the Kansas City area. A fire in May 2020 created further damage to the vacant buildings. They were owned by the Kansas City Life Insurance Company and were demolished in July-August 2020. An identical building on the north side of the street was razed in 1982 for a Kansas City Life Insurance Company expansion project.

References

1909 establishments in Missouri
2020 disestablishments in Missouri
Residential buildings completed in 1909
Buildings and structures in Kansas City, Missouri
Residential buildings on the National Register of Historic Places in Missouri
National Register of Historic Places in Kansas City, Missouri
Buildings and structures demolished in 2020
Demolished buildings and structures in Missouri